The Little Varius is a 1999 Canadian short independent film directed by Alain Jacques. The film centres on a bakery where young musician Mihai (Samuel Robichaud) has left his violin, leaving the owner (Paul Buissonneau) facing an ethical dilemma as he decides whether to return it to the musician or sell it to a wealthy businessman (Pierre Mailloux) who has offered a substantial amount of money for it.

The film won the Genie Award for Best Live Action Short Drama at the 21st Genie Awards.

References

External links
 Online release on Vimeo
 

1999 films
1999 drama films
Best Live Action Short Drama Genie and Canadian Screen Award winners
Quebec films
1990s French-language films
French-language Canadian films
Canadian drama short films
1990s Canadian films